The 1945 LFF Lyga was the 24th season of the LFF Lyga football competition in Lithuania.  Spartakas Kaunas won the championship.

Kaunas Group

Vilnius Group

Šiauliai Group
Spartakas Šiauliai 8-4 Žalgiris Šiauliai

Suduva Group
Žalgiris Marijampolė 3-3 ; 8-0 Sveikata Kybartai

Quarterfinal
Sodyba Klaipėda 1-0 Tauras Tauragė
Spartakas Kaunas 8-2 Žalgiris Marijampolė
Spartakas Šiauliai 12-1 Džiugas Telšiai
Dinamo Vilnius 15-0 MSK Panevėžys

Semifinal
Spartakas Kaunas 3-1 Sodyba Klaipėda
Dinamo Vilnius 6-0 Spartakas Šiauliai

Final
Spartakas Kaunas 4-0 Dinamo Vilnius

References
RSSSF

LFF Lyga seasons
1945 in Lithuanian sport
Lith